Strophomeniidae is a family of solenogaster, a kind of shell-less, worm-like, marine mollusk.

Genera
 Anamenia Nierstrasz, 1908
 Strophomenia Pruvot, 1899

References

 Salvini-Plawen L v. (1978). Antarktische und subantarktische Solenogastres (eine Monographie: 1898-1974). Zoologica (Stuttgart) 128: 1-305. 
 Vaught, K.C.; Tucker Abbott, R.; Boss, K.J. (1989). A classification of the living Mollusca. American Malacologists: Melbourne. ISBN 0-915826-22-4. XII, 195 pp.
 García-Álvarez O. & Salvini-Plawen L.v. (2007). Species and diagnosis of the families and genera of Solenogastres (Mollusca). Iberus 25(2): 73-143.

Solenogastres